Chioides albofasciatus, commonly known as the white-striped longtail, is a species of dicot skipper in the family of butterflies known as Hesperiidae. Chioides albofasciatus is found in Central America and North America.

References

Further reading

External links

 

Eudaminae
Articles created by Qbugbot